Israel Keyes (January 7, 1978 – December 2, 2012) was an American serial killer, bank robber, burglar, arsonist, kidnapper and sex offender who murdered at least three victims and committed dozens of other felonies including armed robbery, arson, rape and burglary across the United States from July 2001 to February 2012. 

While awaiting trial, Keyes committed suicide by hanging and slashing his wrists. Evidence left behind in his jail cell—including a suicide note, drawings of 11 skulls, a drawing of the Baphomet, and an inscription of "Corozal" on the cell's wall (all written or otherwise stained with Keyes' blood)—led the FBI to suspect Keyes murdered at least eleven victims in total. He admitted to having committed violent crimes as early as 1996, with the aggravated sexual assault of a teenage girl in Oregon, in a series of meticulous crimes across multiple states that lasted until his capture in 2012.

Early life

Childhood 
Israel Keyes was born in Richmond, Utah, on January 7, 1978, to Heidi Keyes (née Hakansson) (b. 1954) and John Jeffrey Keyes (1952–2002). He was the second of ten children born to a large family, whose parents were Mormon expats from Torrance, California.

There, Keyes and his siblings were homeschooled and taught Mormon beliefs until 1983. After leaving the Mormon faith, Keyes's father moved the family to a remote plot of land north of Colville, Washington in Stevens County when Israel was five years old. Isolated from society, the Keyes family lived in a one-room cabin located on Rocky Creek Road, where they lived without electricity or running water. In Colville, the family attended services at a church called the Ark, which practiced white supremacist Christian Identity ideology. Keyes later described the Ark as an Amish-like church environment. During this period of attending the Ark, the Keyes family befriended the neighboring family of Chevie Kehoe, who was later convicted for a 1996 triple murder.

Adolescence 
The family attended another church in Colville called the Christian Israel Covenant Church that taught British Israelism as doctrine, that miscegenation was abominable and deviant, that Anglo-Saxons were to rule over the perceived inferior races, and that Keyes later alleged to have been militia-like. For years, some of the Keyes children had been forced to sleep in a tent due to their cabin's small size. To survive, the Keyes children were made to hunt their food, chop firewood, and work on local farms to support the family; as a hobby, Keyes hunted "anything with a heartbeat" and freely admitted to skinning a deer alive to his peers at the church. As a result, Keyes was ostracized and actively avoided by various youths who attended the Christian Israel Covenant Church, with one girl recounting that Keyes's presence "made my skin crawl."

As a youth, Keyes admitted to shooting at neighbors' houses with his BB gun, starting fires in the woods, and breaking into houses for fun. He also occasionally broke into houses with another youth, who subsequently avoided him after witnessing Keyes shoot an animal. On one occasion, Keyes stole several guns from his neighbor's residence, and was forced to apologize by his parents after their discovery of the cache.

Around this time, Keyes's parents provided shelter to personal friends; in the presence of their son and daughter and Keyes's sister, Keyes tied a cat to a tree with a parachute cord and gored it with a .22 revolver. The cat then began circling the tree before crashing into it and vomiting; Keyes allegedly chuckled before noting that the boy–who later informed his father–had vomited in response to the incident. Keyes had an epiphany in which he felt that he was different from his peers, who ran away from him. Upon this realization, he kept his increasingly antisocial behavior to himself, withdrawing socially due to being ostracized. In addition, Keyes's mother began to notice "some troubling signs" in Keyes during this period, when he began tuning into various "radio stations and different things."

By his teenage years, Keyes had become a skilled and proficient carpenter, building his first wooden cabin for his family at age sixteen. He also began working for a Colville contractor from 1995 to 1997. Around this time, Keyes kept a journal from early childhood littered with Bible scriptures, documenting daily sins for which he felt shame such as lusting after his girlfriend. Soon thereafter, the family relocated to Smyrna, Maine, where they collected sap for maple syrup production in a mostly Amish community. Due to their mother's religious zealousness, the Keyes children were forced to secretly flee their parents to watch movies with friends, and were forbidden to learn musical instruments as they were "against God." Sometime during this period, Keyes renounced his former Christian faith.

On one occasion, Keyes declared his atheism to his parents—both of whom he had previously made tireless and constant efforts to please—after an intense argument. This led his parents to evict their eldest son from their residence, shunning him for apparent blasphemy; they then instructed his younger siblings, who looked up to Keyes, to never have contact with him again. Keyes then developed an inordinate interest in Satanism, with plans of committing a ritualistic murder.

Adulthood

Deschutes River assault 
In the summer of 1997 or 1998, Keyes allegedly committed a sexual assault on a teenage girl who had been tubing with her friends down the Deschutes River in Maupin, Oregon. Although this was not his first sexual assault, Keyes admitted that he stalked her from a tree line before "very violently sexually assaulting" the girl—whom he estimated to be between 14 and 18 years of age—by knifepoint. Originally planning to murder her as part of a Satanic ritual, Keyes let her go in the river tube he had abducted her from.

Military service 

On July 9, 1998, Keyes relocated and enlisted in the United States Army in the state of New York, where he served as a Specialist in Alpha Company, 1st Battalion, 5th Infantry Regiment. He passed a rigorous month-long preliminary course for United States Army Rangers training. He was stationed at Fort Lewis and Fort Hood. He also spent time abroad. While stationed in Sinai, Egypt, Keyes befriended several soldiers, informing one of them that he would "like to kill" him.

While at Fort Lewis, he served on a mortar team in the 1st Battalion, 5th Infantry, 25th Infantry Division. Former Army friends of Keyes have noted his quiet demeanor and habit of keeping to himself. On weekends, he was reported to drink heavily, consuming entire bottles of his favorite drink, Wild Turkey bourbon. Keyes was also a fan of the hip hop duo Insane Clown Posse and displayed posters of the musical act in the barracks.

In February 2001, Keyes was arrested for driving under the influence in Thurston County. Pursuant to a plea agreement, he was fined $350. Keyes was awarded an Army Achievement Medal for his meritorious service as a gunner and assistant gunner from December 1998 to July 2001. Keyes was then honorably discharged and he relocated to Neah Bay, Washington.

Subsequent years 
Keyes lived in the Makah Reservation community of Neah Bay, on the Olympic Peninsula.

In 2007, Keyes started a construction business in Alaska, called Keyes Construction while working as a handyman, contractor, and construction worker.

Murders 
Keyes targeted random people all across the United States to avoid detection with months of planning before he committed a particular crime. He specifically went for campgrounds and isolated locations. He claimed to only use guns when he had to and preferred strangulation; this was due to the pleasure he derived from witnessing victims lose consciousness in the struggle. He claimed to not kill children or parents of children, primarily because of his daughter, whom he feared finding out about him and his crimes. However, police and FBI investigators were skeptical of this claim and suspected Keyes of killing several teens or children. 

He is believed to have committed his first murders as a teenager between 1996 and 1997, in and around Colville. Julie Harris, a twelve-year-old Special Olympics medalist in skiing, disappeared in 1996; her remains were found a year later in a wooded area a few miles away. Cassie Emerson, another young girl from the Colville area, was reported missing after her mother's remains were discovered in their burned-out trailer home in June 1997; Cassie's remains were found in 1998 about thirteen miles from her home. There were no arrests in either case. Keyes did not admit to killing either girl, but did admit that his first act of arson was with a trailer. When questioned by police, Keyes's one-time fiancée asked if he was responsible for killing the two Colville girls. 

Keyes did not admit to any murders during his three years in the United States Army, but did admit to twice attempting rapes of women, once with a prostitute while on leave in Egypt, and another time with a college student he met in Israel. He is believed to have resumed his killing spree in 2001 following his discharge. 

Keyes admitted to investigators that he killed four people in Washington State, and claims that he was the subject of an active investigation by the state police and the Federal Bureau of Investigation (FBI). He did not have a felony criminal record in Washington, although he had been stopped on two occasions for minor driving-related offenses. Authorities were reviewing unsolved murder and missing persons cases to determine which, if any, may be linked to Keyes.

Keyes is a suspect in a series of 2007 crimes by the "Boca Killer", near Boca Raton, Florida. The first case tentatively linked to Keyes was the murder of Randi Gorenberg, who in March 2007 was abducted from a shopping mall parking lot. Within an hour her body, with two fatal bullet wounds, was dumped at a different location. The second crime was the kidnapping of an unidentified woman who claimed she and her toddler son were abducted from a shopping mall parking lot on August 7, 2007. Though the kidnapper wore a mask and sunglasses, the victim caught glimpses of his face and described him as a tall, athletically built man with long hair and generally matching Keyes' description. This woman was released unharmed after the assailant forced her to withdraw cash from an automated teller machine. The third Boca case was the murder of Nancy Bochicchio, 47 years old, and her seven-year-old daughter, Joey, who were found fatally shot in their vehicle in a mall parking lot on December 12, 2007. 

Keyes confessed to at least one murder in New York State. In late 2012, authorities had not determined the identity, age, or sex of the victim, or when and where the murder may have occurred, but regarded the confession as credible.

Keyes had ties to New York; he owned  and a dilapidated cabin in the town of Constable. He also confessed to committing bank robberies in New York and Texas. The FBI later confirmed that Keyes robbed the Community Bank branch in Tupper Lake, New York, in April 2009. He also told authorities that he burglarized a Texas home and set it on fire.

Authorities claim Keyes may have murdered a woman believed to be Debra Feldman in April 2009 in New Jersey, and buried her near Tupper Lake, New York. He also admitted to murdering Bill and Lorraine Currier of Essex, Vermont. Keyes broke into the Currier home on the night of June 8, 2011, and tied them up before driving them to an abandoned farmhouse, where he shot Bill before sexually assaulting and strangling Lorraine. Their bodies have never been found.

Two years prior, Keyes hid a "murder kit", which he later used, near the Currier home. After the murders, he moved most of the contents to a new hiding place in Parishville, New York, where they remained until after his arrest.

Keyes' last confirmed victim was 18-year-old Samantha Koenig, a coffee booth employee in Anchorage, Alaska. Keyes kidnapped Koenig from her workplace on February 1, 2012, took her debit card and other property, sexually assaulted her, then killed her the following day. He left her body in a shed and went to New Orleans, where he departed on a pre-booked two-week cruise with his family in the Gulf of Mexico.

When he returned to Alaska, he removed Koenig's body from the shed, applied makeup to the corpse's face, sewed her eyes open with fishing line, and snapped a picture of a four-day-old issue of the Anchorage Daily News alongside her body, posed to appear that she was still alive. After demanding $30,000 in ransom, Keyes dismembered Koenig's body and disposed of it in Matanuska Lake, north of Anchorage.

Keyes is a suspect in the murder of Jimmy Tidwell, an electrician who disappeared near Longview, Texas on February 15, 2012. During a bank robbery in Azle, Texas on February 16, 2012, about 170 miles from Longview, the culprit--believed to be Keyes--wore a white hard hat similar to Tidwell's. 

An FBI report stated that Keyes burglarized 20 to 30 homes across the U.S. and robbed several banks between 2001 and 2012. He may be linked to as many as 11 deaths in the United States, and potentially even more victims outside the country.

Keyes planned murders long ahead of time and took extraordinary action to avoid detection. Unlike most serial killers, he did not have a victim profile, saying he chose a victim randomly. He usually killed far from home, and never in the same area twice. On his murder trips, he kept his mobile phone turned off and paid for items with cash. He had no connection to any of his known victims. For the Currier murders, Keyes flew to Chicago, where he rented a car to drive  to Vermont. He then used the 'kill kit' he had hidden two years earlier to perform the murders.

Study of serial killers 
Having read Mindhunter: Inside the FBI's Elite Serial Crime Unit from his youth and continuing to meticulously study serial killers, Keyes idolized Ted Bundy and felt that he shared many similarities with him: both were methodical and felt as though they possessed their victims despite their difference in victim choice and modus operandi. 

He even went as far as to imitate Bundy's court escape, before being seized by guards immediately. Keyes also admired and studied other serial killers, but actively shunned media attention for his crimes as he was fearful for his family and being labelled a "copycat" for his admiration of Bundy and other murderers. Keyes also called Dennis Rader a "wimp" for apologizing in court and showing remorse for his crimes, in addition to expressing admiration for serial killers "that haven't been caught."

When asked in an interview about Robert Hansen, Keyes replied enthusiastically, stating, "Yeah, I know all about him," before continuing, "I probably know every single serial killer that's ever been written about. It's kind of a hobby of mine." When FBI agents informed him of the 2012 Aurora, Colorado shooting he inquired as to the status of the shooter. Keyes had also expressed mild interest in the mass murder's perpetrator, James Holmes.

Investigation and arrest
After Koenig's murder, Keyes demanded ransom money and police were able to track withdrawals from the account as he moved throughout the southwestern U.S. During that time, the police controversially refused to release surveillance video of Koenig's abduction.

Keyes was arrested by Texas Highway Patrol Corporal Bryan Henry and Texas Ranger Steven Rayburn in the parking lot of the Cotton Patch Café in Lufkin, Texas, on the morning of March 13, 2012. Investigators had circulated a lookout bulletin for the suspect's car, which had been used at ATMs to withdraw money from Koenig's account. Keyes's car matched this description. Keyes was stopped after he drove slightly over the speed limit. His vehicle was searched after officers spotted cash stained with bright ink, indicating a dye pack from a bank robbery. Koenig's ATM card and cell phone were also discovered in Keyes's car. 

Keyes was subsequently extradited to Alaska, where he confessed to the Koenig murder. He was represented by the Federal Public Defender for Alaska Rich Curtner. Keyes was indicted in the case, and his trial was scheduled to begin in March 2013.

While incarcerated, Keyes spoke to investigators several times over a period of months. He cooperated to an extent, confessing to some of his crimes, and stated a wish to be executed within a year. Keyes said he wanted to avoid publicity due to the negative attention his young daughter might face, but largely stopped cooperating after his identity was discussed in the media.

On Wednesday, May 23, 2012, Keyes attempted to escape during a routine hearing. He used wood shavings from a pencil to pick his cuffs. Police used a taser to subdue him.

Suicide

While being held in jail at the Anchorage Correctional Complex on suspicion of murder, Keyes managed to conceal a razor blade in his cell. He was not allowed razor blades, being under security restrictions of using an electric razor under supervision. He died by suicide on December 2, 2012, via cutting his wrists and attempted strangulation. A suicide note, found under his body, consisted of an "ode to murder" but offered no clues about other possible victims.

In 2020, the FBI released the drawings of 11 skulls and one pentagram, which had been drawn in blood and found underneath Keyes' jail-cell bed after his suicide. One of the drawings included the phrase "WE ARE ONE" written at the bottom. The FBI believes the number of skulls correlates with what are believed to be the total number of his victims.

In media 
Keyes has been the subject of multiple books, podcasts, and the documentary Method of a Serial Killer released in 2018 by the Oxygen channel.
Most of the FBI interrogations were released publicly by Anchorage Daily News to SoundCloud that same year. They were removed from SoundCloud in 2019 but have since become available on the YouTube channel TopNotchDocumentaries

Bibliography

See also 
List of serial killers in the United States

References

External links

 Profile of Serial Killer Israel Keyes at About.com
 Acting at Random: A Study of Israel Keyes
 
From FBI.gov
 FBI Requests the Public's Assistance Concerning Israel Keyes
 FBI Asks for Help Identifying Potential First Victim of Serial Killer
 New information released in serial killer case

1978 births
2012 suicides
20th-century American criminals
21st-century American criminals
American arsonists
American atheists
American bank robbers
American burglars
American male criminals
American nomads
American people of English descent
American people of Irish descent
American people of Swedish descent
American people of Welsh descent
American people who died in prison custody
American rapists
American Satanists
American serial killers
Christian Identity
Male serial killers
Military personnel from Utah
Necrophiles
People from Colville, Washington
People from Neah Bay, Washington
People from Richmond, Utah
Prisoners who died in Alaska detention
Serial killers who committed suicide in prison custody
Suicides by sharp instrument in the United States
Suicides in Alaska
United States Army soldiers